A skillet is a frying pan, generally large and heavy.

Skillet may also refer to:
 Skillet (band), an American Christian rock band

See also 
 Frying pan (disambiguation)